William Hornbeck (August 23, 1901 – October 11, 1983) was an American film editor and film industry executive. In a 1977 poll of film editors, he had been called "the best film editor the industry has produced."
He was nominated four times for the Academy Award for Best Film Editing, and won the award for A Place in the Sun (1951). Other important credits include It's a Wonderful Life (1946), Giant (1956), and I Want to Live! (1958). He edited films from notable directors including Zoltan Korda, Frank Capra, and George Stevens. Universal Pictures almost brought him on board to completely re-edit George Lucas' American Graffiti.

Hornbeck started his editing career in his teens with the Keystone Studios, which were located close to his family's home in Los Angeles, California. In the 1920s he became head of the editing department, working on dozens of films each year. In 1934 he went to England, where he headed the editing department for Alexander Korda's film production company. He was generally credited as the "supervising editor"; an exception was The Scarlet Pimpernel (1934), where he was credited as the editor. In 1941 he returned to the United States, and during World War II he served in the Pictorial Service of the Signal Corps of the United States Army. His unit, which produced the films in the Why We Fight series, was led by Frank Capra. Following the war he worked as an editor for a succession of studios and as a freelance editor. In 1960 Hornbeck became the Supervisor for Editorial Operations for Universal Pictures. In 1966 he became a vice-president of the same company. Hornbeck retired in 1976.

Hornbeck was one of the original members of the American Cinema Editors, the honorary society of film editors, when it was founded in 1950. Hornbeck died in 1983. In her appreciation, Jeanine Basinger wrote "A true pioneer and a major international influence on film editing, Hornbeck and his work should be remembered for its quality and influence, as well as for his contribution in terms of training a whole generation of young editors in both England and America."  Some of his papers are included in the Ogden and Mary Louise Reid Cinema Archives at Wesleyan University

Selected filmography
Filmography based on the listing at the Internet Movie Database.
1959 Suddenly, Last Summer (editorial consultant - as William W. Hornbeck)
1958 I Want to Live!
1958 The Quiet American
1956 Giant
1954 The Barefoot Contessa
1953 Shane
1952 Something to Live For
1951 A Place in the Sun
1949 The Heiress
1948 State of the Union
1947 Singapore
1946 It's a Wonderful Life
1942 Jungle Book (supervising film editor)
1941 Lydia (supervising film editor)
1941 That Hamilton Woman (supervising editor)
1940 The Thief of Bagdad (supervising editor)
1940 21 Days Together (supervising editor)
1939 The Lion Has Wings (supervising editor)
1939 The Four Feathers (supervising editor)
1939 The Spy in Black (supervising film editor)
1939 Clouds Over Europe (supervising editor)
1939 Over the Moon (supervising editor)
1938 Drums (supervising editor)
1938 The Divorce of Lady X (supervising editor)
1937 Return of the Scarlet Pimpernel (supervising editor)
1937 Storm in a Teacup (supervising editor - as W. Hornbeck)
1937 Knight Without Armour (supervising editor)
1937 Elephant Boy (supervising editor)
1937 Dark Journey (supervising editor)
1936 The Man Who Could Work Miracles (supervising editor)
1936 Men Are Not Gods (supervising editor)
1936 Rembrandt (supervising editor)
1936 Things to Come (supervising editor)
1935 The Ghost Goes West (supervising editor)
1935 I Stand Condemned (supervising editor)
1935 Sanders of the River (supervising editor)
1934 The Scarlet Pimpernel
1926 Flirty Four-Flushers

See also
List of film director and editor collaborations - Hornbeck edited four films directed by Frank Capra. It's a Wonderful Life (1946) received numerous Academy Award nominations. Vincent LoBrutto included an analysis of Hornbeck's contributions in his 2012 book,The Art of Motion Picture Editing.

References

Further reading
 Confirms birth and death dates; contains links to interviews of Hornbeck.
Certain of his film related material and personal papers are contained in the Wesleyan University Cinema Archives to which scholars and media experts from around the world may have full access. See  Includes a brief biography.

American film editors
American Cinema Editors
Best Film Editing Academy Award winners
1901 births
1983 deaths